Thomas Timothy Vernon-Kell (born 10 May 1981) is an English self-taught multi-instrumentalist musician who works under the name of  Tom Vek.

Career
Born in Hounslow, London, England, he signed to the small label Tummy Touch Records in 2001, having spent the previous eight years writing and recording in his parents' garage.

Vek's debut album We Have Sound was recorded whilst he completed a graphic design degree. The album was finished in mid-2004 but was not released until 2005 when Island Records licensed it through Go! Beat Records. The record was subsequently licensed through Universal Records to Startime International for a North American release.

Vek made a guest appearance on the television programme, The OC, where he performed a gig at 'The Bait Shop' venue; the third-season episode 'The Road Warrior' featured his track "I Ain't Saying My Goodbyes". He also contributed to the Grand Theft Auto IV soundtrack, with "One Horse Race" which was the B-side to his single, "Nothing but Green Lights".

Vek released his second album, Leisure Seizure, in 2011 after a six-year absence from the music industry. The first single from the album, "A Chore", had its Radio 1 debut on Zane Lowe's show on 18 April that year. In 2012, his song "Aroused" from the album was featured on the soundtrack of Forza Horizon. Also in 2011, he was guest vocalist on the album track, and single,  "Warning Call", on DJ Shadow's The Less You Know, the Better.

On 11 April 2014, Vek announced his third album, Luck, along with the release of the album's first single, 'Sherman (Animals in the Jungle)'. Luck was finally released in June 2014 to mixed reviews. NME said about the album  "There are flashes of brilliance but the singer's third album misfires too often" while the Guardian was more favourable, describing it as "deliciously unpredictable"

On 12 November 2020, Vek announced his fourth album, New Symbols, and Sleevenote, a music player device he designed. 

On 8 August 2022, Vek released a Newer Symbols, a "full re-work" of New Symbols. Each track of Newer Symbols shares its name with a track from New Symbols, with the word "new" added. Vek also made an NFT available for each track.

Discography

Studio albums

EPs

Singles

References

External links
 Official website
 
 Tom Vek at Last.fm
 Interview with Tom Vek after a concert in Moscow in 2014 (in Russian)

1981 births
Living people
English rock guitarists
English male guitarists
English male singer-songwriters
Singers from London
People from Hounslow
People educated at King's College School, London
Alumni of Central Saint Martins
English multi-instrumentalists
21st-century English singers
21st-century British guitarists
21st-century British male singers
Moshi Moshi Records artists
Island Records artists
Go! Beat artists